The 2009–10 season of the Israeli Futsal League was the 4th season of top-tier futsal under the Israel Football Association and 10th overall. The regular season started on 24 February 2010 and was concluded on 7 April 2010. The championship playoffs began on 14 April 2010 with semi-finals series and concluded with the championship final series, played on 11 and 12 May.

Yanshufei Agudat Sport Tel Aviv were the defending champions and retained the title by beating Hapoel Ironi Rishon LeZion in the 2009–10 Championship Final series.

Format changes
With 10 clubs registered to play in the league, the clubs were split into two groups with 5 teams in each, which played each other once. The top 4 teams in each group qualified to the championship play-offs, while the bottom clubs played for 9th place.

Regular season table

Group A

Group B

Playoffs

Championship bracket

5th to 8th place

9th place match

External links
Israeli Futsal League 2009-2010 IFA

References

Israeli Futsal League
Futsal
Israel